Paul Gottlieb Werlhof (24 March 1699 – 26 July 1767) was a German physician and poet who was a native of Helmstedt. 

He studied medicine at the University of Helmstedt under Lorenz Heister (1683–1758) and Brandanus Meibom (1678–1740), who was the son of Heinrich Meibom (1638–1700).  After completing his studies, he practiced medicine in Peine for four years, and in 1725 moved to Hannover, where he became one of the more influential physicians in Europe.  In 1740 was appointed Königlicher Leibarzt, physician to Hannover royalty.  Werlhof would remain in Hannover until his death in 1767.

In 1735, Werlhof presented the first description of idiopathic thrombocytopenic purpura (ITP), a bleeding disorder.  In addition to his reputation as a physician, Werlhof was highly regarded as a poet, and was a good friend of anatomist Albrecht von Haller (1708–1777), who was also an accomplished poet.  Werlhof composed his poems and hymns in German, while his medical treatises were written in Latin.  Among his written works were a 1732 treatise on fevers called Observationes de febribus, and a collection of poetry titled Gedichte.

References 

 Paul Gottlieb Werlhof @ Who Named It

1699 births
1767 deaths
People from Helmstedt
18th-century German physicians
Fellows of the Royal Society
German medical writers